The Carle Honors are annual awards given by the Eric Carle Museum of Picture Book Art to individuals and organizations in the picture book field for their dedication and creative vision. They are named in honor of the American author and illustration of children's picture books Eric Carle.

Categories of honorees 
There are four categories of honoree:
 Artist Honoree - for an exceptional picture book creator
 Angel Honoree - for an individual who has supported and advocated for picture book writers and artists
 Bridge Honoree - presented to individuals who have taken innovative approaches to expanding picture book readership
 Mentor Honoree - presented to editors, educators, and designers

Carle Honorees  
Source:

1st Carle Honorees – 2006 
 Artist: Rosemary Wells
 Angel: Helen Bing
 Bridge: Morton Schindel
 Mentor: Ann Beneduce
 Presenters: Jane Bayard Curley and Leonard S. Marcus

2nd Carle Honorees – 2007 
 Artist: Ashley Bryan
 Angel: Martin Pope and Lillie Pope
 Bridge: Twila Liggett
 Mentor: Margaret McElderry
 Presenters: Jane Bayard Curley and Leonard S. Marcus

3rd Carle Honorees – 2008 
 Artist: Maurice Sendak
 Angel: Jim Oelschlager and Vanita Oelschlager
 Bridge: Jim Trelease
 Mentor: Susan Hirschman

4th Carle Honorees – 2009 
 Artist: Alice Provensen
 Angel: Kyle Zimmer
 Bridge: Blouke Carus and Marianne Carus
 Mentor: Walter Lorraine
 Co-Chairs: Jon Scieszka and Jamie Lee Curtis

5th Carle Honorees – 2010  
 Artist: David Macaulay
 Angel: Allan Daniel and Kendra Daniel
 Bridge: Nancy Schon
 Mentor: Stephen Mooser & Lin Oliver
 Co-Chairs: Les Charles and Zora Charles and Chris Van Allsburg and Lisa Van Allsburg

6th Carle Honorees – 2011 
 Artist: Lois Ehlert
 Angel: Jeanne Steig
 Bridge: Karen Nelson Hoyle
 Mentor: Michael Di Capua
 Co-Chairs: Jerry Pinkney and Gloria Jean Pinkney and Maurice Sendak

7th Carle Honorees – 2012 
 Artist: Lane Smith
 Angel: Kent L. Brown, Jr.
 Bridge: Christopher Cerf
 Mentor: Frances Foster
 Co-Chairs: Jules Feiffer, Kate Feiffer, and Norton Juster and Jeanne Juster

8th Carle Honorees – 2013 
 Artist: Chris Van Allsburg
 Angel: Lynda Johnson Robb and Carol Rasco
 Mentor: Phyllis Fogelman Baker
 Bridge: Barbara Bader
 Co-Chairs: Tony DiTerlizzi and Angela DiTerlizzi

9th Carle Honorees – 2014 
 Artist:Jerry Pinkney
 Angel: Reach Out and Read, represented by Brian Gallagher and Dr. Perri Klass
 Mentor: Dr. Henrietta Mays Smith
 Bridge: Françoise Mouly
 Presenters: Tony DiTerlizzi and Angela DiTerlizzi

10th Carle Honorees – 2015   
 Artist: Helen Oxenbury
 Angel: The Cotsen Children’s Library at Princeton University, represented by Corinna Cotsen and Andrea Immel 
 Mentor: Neal Porter
 Bridge: Joan Bertin, executive director of the National Coalition Against Censorship (NCAC)
 Presenter: David Macaulay

11th Carle Honorees – 2016 
 Artist: Allen Say
 Angel: Lee & Low Books, represented by Jason Low
 Mentor: Regina Hayes
 Bridge: Steven Heller
 Presenter: Gregory Maguire

12th Carle Honorees – 2017 
 Artist: Ed Young
 Angel: Dr. John Y. Cole
 Mentor: Bank Street Writers Lab, represented by Chairperson Dr. Cynthia Weill
 Bridge: Anthea Bell
 Presenter: Jack Gantos

13th Carle Honorees – 2018   
 Artist: Paul O. Zelinsky, illustrator  
 Angel: The Sendak Fellowship & Workshop, represented by Lynn Caponera and Dona Ann McAdams
 Mentor: Dr. Rudine Sims Bishop
 Bridge: The Bologna Children’s Book Fai, represented byElena Pasoli
 Host: Andrea Davis Pinkney

14th Carle Honorees – 2019  
 Artist: Melissa Sweet, author-illustrator
 Angel: REFORMA, the National Association to Promote Library and Information Services to Latinos and the Spanish Speaking
 Mentor: David Saylor, VP and Creative Director of Scholastic; founder and publisher of Graphix
 Bridge: Takeshi Matsumoto, founder of the Chihiro Art Museum in Japan

2020 Carle Honors - cancelled due to Covid 19

15th Carle Honorees – 2021  
 Artist: Raúl Colón
 Angel: Every Child a Reader, represented by Carl Lennertz
 Mentor: Patricia Aldana
 Bridge: Dennis M. V. David and Justin G. Schiller

16th Carle Honorees – 2022  
 Artist: Faith Ringgold, painter, teacher and author
 Angel: Dolly Parton’s Imagination Library
 Mentor: Wade Hudson and Cheryl Hudson, authors, publishers and champions for diversity equity and inclusion
 Bridge: Ajia, translator, author, promoter of picture books

References

External links
 Eric Carle Museum of Picture Book Art

Visual arts media
Illustrated book awards